The 2005 NCAA Women's Division I Swimming and Diving Championships were contested at the 24th annual NCAA-sanctioned swim meet to determine the team and individual national champions of Division I women's collegiate swimming and diving in the United States.

This year's events were hosted by Purdue University at the Boilermaker Aquatic Center in West Lafayette, Indiana.

After three consecutive second-place finishes, Georgia returned to the top of the team standings, finishing 117.5 points ahead of three-time defending champions Auburn. This was the Bulldogs' fourth women's team title.

Team standings
 Note: Top 10 only
 (H) = Hosts
 (DC) = Defending champions
 Full results

See also
 List of college swimming and diving teams

References

NCAA Division I Swimming And Diving Championships
NCAA Division I Swimming And Diving Championships
NCAA Division I Women's Swimming and Diving Championships